Marie of Champagne ( – 29 August 1204) was the first Latin Empress of Constantinople by marriage to Emperor Baldwin I. She acted as regent of Flanders during the absence of her spouse from 1202 until 1204.

Life
Marie was a daughter of Henry I, Count of Champagne, and Marie, daughter of King Louis VII of France and Eleanor of Aquitaine.

According to the chronicle of Gislebert of Mons, on 13 May 1179 Marie was officially bethrothed to Baldwin, son of the count of Flanders and Hainaut, to whom she was already promised to be wed in 1171. Her betrothed was Baldwin VI, son of Baldwin V, Count of Hainaut and Margaret I, Countess of Flanders.

Countess of Flanders
On 6 January 1186, Marie and Baldwin were married at Valenciennes.

The young countess consort issued charters in her own name and seems to have a soft spot for the cities in Flanders. In 1200 she and her husband also released the Ninove and Bohéries Abbey from every toll on their territory.

In 1200 she and her husband took the cross in Bruges. On 14 April 1202 her husband left Flanders to join the Fourth Crusade. During her husband's absence, Marie acted as regent for Flanders for two years.

Marie herself left Flanders to join her husband in Outremer. According to Geoffrey of Villehardouin and other authors she could not join him in the crusade earlier as she was pregnant at the time of his departure. After delivery of the child, Margaret and sufficient recovery, she set forth to join him.

Latin Empress 
Her husband's Crusade was diverted to Constantinople, capital of the Roman Empire, where the crusaders captured and sacked the city. Then the Crusaders and Venetian established the Latin Empire of Romaniae in place of the fallen one. On 9 May 1204, Baldwin was elected its first Emperor making Marie the Empress.

She set sail from the port of Marseille and landed in Acre. It was only when she arrived in Outremer that the news reached her of the fall of Constantinople and the election of Baldwin as the new Emperor of the East. There as an Empress of Constantinople she received the homage of the Prince Bohemond IV of Antioch. She wanted to set sail for Constantinople but fell sick and died in the Holy Land.

News of her death reached Constantinople through Crusading reinforcements from Syria. Baldwin was reportedly afflicted by the death of his wife. Villehardouin reports that Marie "was a gracious and virtuous lady and greatly honoured".

Children
They had two known children:

 Joan, Countess of Flanders (1199/1200 – 5 December 1244).
 Margaret II, Countess of Flanders (2 June 1202 – 10 February 1280).

Ancestry

Notes

Historical sources
 Alberic of Trois-Fontaines, Chronica Alberici Monachi Trium Fontium.
 Gislebert of Mons, Chronicon Hanoniense (Chronicle of Hainaut).
 Geoffrey of Villehardouin, De la Conquête de Constantinople

References
 Karen S. Nicholas, Countesses as Rulers in Flanders, in Theodore Evergates (ed.), Aristocratic Women in Medieval France, (University of Pennsylvania Press, 1999), pp. 111–137 (especially pp. 127–129).

External links

 

|-

1170s births
1204 deaths
Year of birth uncertain
Latin Empresses of Constantinople
Countesses of Flanders
Countesses of Hainaut
House of Blois
13th-century women rulers
12th-century women from the county of Flanders
Christians of the Fourth Crusade